August Anheuser Busch III (born June 16, 1937) is a great-grandson of Anheuser-Busch founder Adolphus Busch and was the company's Chairman until November 30, 2006. August Busch III is informally known as "Auggie" and as "The Third" or "Three Sticks" by subordinates and employees at Anheuser-Busch.

He is the father of August Busch IV.

Early life
August Anheuser Busch III was born in St. Louis, Missouri on June 16, 1937. In 1956 he graduated from Ladue Horton Watkins High School. He attended the University of Arizona, but dropped out after failing. His father then gave him an ultimatum, and he began working in an entry-level position in Anheuser Busch.

Career
August Busch III served as President of the Anheuser-Busch Companies, Inc. (ABC) from 1974 until June 2002, and chief executive officer of ABC from 1975 until June 2002. He was chairman of the Board of Directors of ABC from 1977 to 2006.

He was succeeded as the day-to-day operational head of Anheuser-Busch by Patrick Stokes. Stokes' tenure marked the first time in the history of the company that a non-Busch family member ran the day-to-day operations. Busch also conferred the chairmanship to Stokes effective December 1, 2006. He retired from their executive functions at the company on November 30, 2006.

He has been a director of AT&T Inc. since October 1983. He served as a Director of Southwestern Bell Telephone Company from 1980 to 1983. The CEO of SBC/AT&T, Ed Whitacre, simultaneously served on the board of A-B. They were joined on both boards by Charlie Knight, the CEO of Emerson Electric. Whitacre also served on the board of Emerson. Busch voted to approve $115 million of pay for Whitacre in a five-year period. Busch is Chairman of the Anheuser-Busch Corporate Governance and Nominating Committee and a member of the Corporate Development Committee and the Executive Committee.

As of 2007, Busch remains a Director of Emerson Electric Co.

Personal life
He has been married twice. His first wife, Susan, is the mother of his two older children August Anheuser Busch IV and Susan Busch-Transou. His second wife, Virginia, who is a practicing attorney, is the mother of his younger two children, Steven Busch and Virginia "Ginny" Busch.

Unlike his father Gussie Busch, August III has been a lifelong supporter of the Republican Party, and a friend, ally, and financial supporter to Senator John McCain (R-AZ) and President George W. Bush. August III's eldest son, August A. Busch IV, is a strong supporter of Democratic Party politics, just like his grandfather Gussie.

All four of his children are involved in the business functions of Anheuser-Busch to varying degrees: August IV was the president and CEO of the Anheuser-Busch Companies, Inc.; Susie Busch-Transou and her husband, Tripp, own Tri-Eagle Sales, a distributorship near Tallahassee, Florida; Steven Busch was his father's executive assistant and now owns Krey Distributing Company in St. Peters, Missouri; and Ginny Busch is employed by Busch Entertainment Company (BEC), working closely with A-B's SeaWorld and Busch Gardens family theme park businesses. Both August A. Busch III and August A. Busch Jr. were inducted into the Junior Achievement U.S. Business Hall of fame in 2005.

August Anheuser Busch III was responsible for the donation of Mike IV, the live Bengal Tiger mascot of Louisiana State University in 1976. Mike IV, originally Jerry, was born in 1974 at Busch Gardens in Tampa, Florida. He was LSU's mascot through the end of 1989 and died in 1995.

References

1937 births
American drink industry businesspeople
University of Arizona alumni
August
Living people
Businesspeople from St. Louis
Missouri Republicans
American brewers